Richard Krust (born 4 August 1928) is a German archer. He competed in the men's individual event at the 1972 Summer Olympics.

References

1928 births
Living people
German male archers
Olympic archers of West Germany
Archers at the 1972 Summer Olympics
Sportspeople from Karlsruhe (region)
People from Enzkreis